Jean-François Brun (born 14 May 1943) is a French philatelist who was appointed to the Roll of Distinguished Philatelists in 1998.

References

External links
http://www.jfbphilatelie.com/

French philatelists
Living people
Signatories to the Roll of Distinguished Philatelists
1943 births